Capovalle (before 1907 Hano) is a town and comune in the Italian province of Brescia, in Lombardy in the upper Valle Sabbia.

References

Cities and towns in Lombardy